La Barra is a resort in the Maldonado Department of southeastern Uruguay.

Geography
The resort is located on Route 10, south of its junction with Ruta Interbalnearia. Its west coast is on the mouth of Arroyo Maldonado, while its south coast in on the Atlantic Ocean. It lies just across San Rafael - El Placer to the west, with which they are connected with the nearby bridge Puente de Barra de Maldonado, famous for its architecture. It borders the resort El Tesoro to the northwest and to the east a neighbourhood called "Barrio San Carlos", which lies just west of the resort Manantiales.

Population
In 2011 La Barra had a population of 339 permanent inhabitants and 1,210 dwellings.
 
Source: Instituto Nacional de Estadística de Uruguay

Places of worship
 Parish Church of Our Lady of the Rosary (Roman Catholic)

Attractions
 Museum of the sea (Uruguay)

References

External links
INE map of El Tesoro, La Barra, Laguna Blanca, Manantiales and El Chorro

Populated places in the Maldonado Department
Seaside resorts in Uruguay